Agriotes sordidus is a species of beetle in the family Elateridae and the genus Agriotes.

Description
Beetle in length 8-9mm.

References

External links
Information and Images of Agriotes sordidus

Beetles described in 1807
Elateridae